Young Love, Sweet Love is a Philippine romantic drama anthology which aired on Radio Philippines Network from March 5, 1987 to 1993. It was hosted by German Moreno and later Manilyn Reynes.

Hosts
German Moreno (1987–1990)
Manilyn Reynes (1990–1993)

See also
List of Philippine television shows
List of programs previously broadcast by Radio Philippines Network

Philippine comedy television series
1987 Philippine television series debuts
1993 Philippine television series endings
Radio Philippines Network original programming